Nine Livez is the debut album by rapper, Nine release on March 7, 1995, through Profile Records and recorded in 1994. The album spawned the two singles " Whutcha Want?" & "Any Emcee". The album peeked at number #90 on the US Billboard 200, and number #18 on the Billboard Top R&B/Hip Hop Albums Chart.

Background 
Nine Livez was released through Profile Records on March 7, 1995.

Three singles were released from the album. The first was "Whutcha Want?", released on January 24, 1995. The song was Nine's most successful single, reaching #50 on the Billboard 200, his only single to reach that chart, while also reaching three other Billboard charts, gaining the most success on the Hot Rap Singles chart where it peaked at 3. The second single was Any Emcee, released on March 28, 1995. The song heavily sampled the bass line of "I'll Be Around" by The Spinners, while the chorus was taken from Eric B. & Rakim's "My Melody". "Any Emcee" made it to three Billboard charts, its highest chart position was 21 on the Hot Dance Music/Maxi-Singles Sales. The third was "Ova Confident", but it did not reach the Billboard charts. All three singles had promotional music videos shot and released.

Reception 
Critically, Nine Livez was met with favorable reviews, Allmusic gave the album a solid 3 out of a possible 5 stars calling the album "Far from a classic, Nine Livez is an under-appreciated album from an underrated artist". Rap Reviews gave the album a more favorable review, giving it 8.0 out of a possible 10 and calling it "one of the best albums of 1995, if not the entire decade".

Nine Livez  peaked at 90 on the Billboard 200 and #18 on the Billboard Top R&B/Hip-Hop Albums, reaching both those positions on March 25, 1995.
The entire album was produced by Rob Lewis for Fed Productions except for tracks 1,2,9,& 12 which were produced by Tony Stoute for Dead President Productions

Track listing 
 "Intro (Death of a Demo)" / "Ova Confident"
 "Redrum"
 "Da Fundamentalz"
 "Hit Em Like Dis" (featuring Froggy Frog)
 "Who U Won Test"
 "Whutcha Want?"
 "Fo'eva Blunted"
 "Peel"
 "Retaliate" (featuring A.R.L. Da X'Rsis)
 "Tha Cypha" 
 "Ahh Shit"
 "Any Emcee"
 "Ta Rasss"

Bonus Tracks on 2014 Smoke On Records re-issue 
 "Me, Myself And My Microphone"
 "Whutcha Want? (Remix)"

Chart history

References

External links 
 [ Nine Livez] at Allmusic
 Nine Livez at Discogs
 Nine Livez at Tower Records
 [ Nine Livez] at Billboard

1995 debut albums
Nine (rapper) albums
Profile Records albums